Chandabali is a Vidhan Sabha constituency of Bhadrak district, Odisha.

Area of this constituency includes Chandabali, Chandabali block and 8 GPs (Daulatapur, Bamanbindha, Harisinghpur, Jamjodi, Rajnagar, Barasar, Sahapur and Gobindapur) of Tihidi block.

In 2019 election, Biju Janata Dal candidate Byomkesh Ray defeated Bharatiya Janata party candidate Manmohan Samal by a margin of 8080 votes.

Elected Members
16 elections held during 1951 to 2019. Elected members from the Chandabali constituency are:
2019: (47): Byomkesh Ray (BJD)
2014: (47): Byomkesh Ray (BJD)
2009: (47): Bijaya Nayak (BJD)
2004: (21): Netrananda Mallick (Congress)
2000: (21): Bishnu Charan Sethi (BJP)
1995: (21): Netrananda Mallick (Congress)
1990: (21): Bairagi Jena (Janata Dal)
1985: (21): Netrananda Mallick (Congress)
1980: (21): Netrananda Mallick (Congress-I)
1977: (21): Gangadhar Das (Janata Party)
1974: (18): Manmohan Das (Congress)
1971: (20): Gangadhar Das (Congress)
1967: (20): Manmohan Das (Orissa Jana Congress)
1961: (122): Bairagi Jena (Congress)
1957: (86): Nandakishore Jena (Congress)
1952: (60): Brundaban Das (Congress)
1952: (60): Chakradhar Behera (Congress)

Election Results

2019

2014 Election Result
In 2014 election, Biju Janata Dal candidate Byomkesh Ray defeated Indian National Congress candidate Amiya Kumar Mahapatra by a margin of 24,883 votes.

2009

Notes

References

Assembly constituencies of Odisha
Bhadrak district